The Olivier Messiaen Competition is an international contemporary piano competition organized by the City of Paris in homage to the French composer Olivier Messiaen. The first edition took place in 2000.

Laureates of the competition

See also 
 List of classical music competitions

References

External links 
 Olivier Messiaen competition (2003)
 Concours internationaux de la Ville de Paris

Classical music awards
Music competitions in France
Piano competitions
Music in Paris